Ion Mateescu (25 November 1952 – 30 September 2017) was a Romanian footballer who played as a left defender and midfielder.

International career
Ion Mateescu played one game at international level for Romania, in a friendly which ended 2–2 against the Soviet Union. He also played one game for Romania's Olympic team against France which ended with a 4–0 loss at the 1976 Summer Olympics qualifiers.

Honours
Flacăra Moreni
Divizia B: 1985–86

Notes

References

External links
Ion Mateescu at Labtof.ro

1952 births
2017 deaths
Romanian footballers
Romania international footballers
Association football defenders
Liga I players
Liga II players
Faur București players
FC Brașov (1936) players
FC Rapid București players
FC Dinamo București players
AFC Rocar București players
FCV Farul Constanța players
FC Progresul București players
CSM Flacăra Moreni players
CSM Deva players